Carnide station is part of the Blue Line of the Lisbon Metro and is located near the Bairro da Horta Nova neighbourhood of Lisbon.

History
The station opened in October 18, 1997, in conjunction with the Pontinha station, and it is located on Avenida Marechal Teixeira Rebelo, close to Avenida dos Condes de Carnide, from which it takes its name. 

The architectural design of the station is by José de Guimarães.

Connections

Urban buses

Carris 

 729 Bairro Padre Cruz ⇄ Algés

Suburban buses

Rodoviária de Lisboa 

 210 Lisboa (Colégio Militar) ⇄ Caneças (Jardim)

See also
 List of Lisbon metro stations

References

External links

Blue Line (Lisbon Metro) stations
Railway stations opened in 1997